Kenneth Macleay Phin (1816–1888) was a Scottish minister who served as Moderator of the General Assembly of the Church of Scotland in 1877. He ran the Church of Scotland’s Home Mission Scheme. As a church campaigner and pamphleteer he was known as The Investigator.

Life

He was born on 23 April 1816 the only son of Rev Robert Phin (1777–1840) minister of Wick and his wife Margaret Elizabeth, the daughter of Provost Macleay of Caithness. His mother died soon after he was born. He was sent to study at Edinburgh University and licensed to preach as a Church of Scotland minister by the Presbytery of Caithness in November 1837.

He was ordained as minister of Galashiels from May 1841 under patronage of Hugh Scott of Gala.
He was a member of the Wodrow Society, based in Edinburgh 1841 to 1847.
In 1863 he spoke against the admission of women into Scottish universities. He retired in 1870 and thereafter committed himself fully to Mission work in the Scottish cities. His position in Galashiels was filled by Rev Paton James Gloag. From 1863 to 1888 Phin was Convenor of the Army and Navy Chaplains Committee. Edinburgh University awarded him an honorary Doctor of Divinity in 1869.

During his mission work he operated from 22 Queen Street in Edinburgh's New Town and lived at 13 Chalmers Street near the Edinburgh Royal Infirmary.

He lived his final years at 13 Chalmers Street in Edinburgh.

He died in Edinburgh on 12 January 1888. He is buried in Grange Cemetery. The grave lies on the south edge of the north-west section, backing onto the embankment.

Family

In March 1852 he was married to Margaret Thomson Pitcairn (1826-1905) of 8 Ainslie Place on the Moray Estate in Edinburgh's West End, daughter of the late James Pitcairn MD.

References

1816 births
1888 deaths
Alumni of the University of Edinburgh
People from Caithness
Moderators of the General Assembly of the Church of Scotland
19th-century Ministers of the Church of Scotland